Marcellino is both a given name and a surname. Notable people with the name include:

Marcellino de Baggis (1971–2011), Italian cinematographer and director
Marcellino da Civezza (born 1822), Italian Franciscan author
Marcellino Gavilán (1909–1999), Spanish horse rider and Olympics competitor
Santi Marcellino e Pietro al Laterano, Roman Catholic parish and titular church in Rome on the Via Merulana
Marcellino van der Leeuw (born 1990), Dutch footballer
Marcellino Lucchi (born 1957), Italian former Grand Prix motorcycle road racer
Carl L. Marcellino (born 1942), member of the New York State Senate
Dennis Marcellino (born 1948), American musician, speaker and author of psychology, philosophy, theology and political books
Fred Marcellino (1939–2001), American illustrator and later an author of children's books
Jocko Marcellino (born 1950), American singer, musician, songwriter, producer and actor, one of the founders of Sha Na Na
Muzzy Marcellino (1912–1997), American singer and musician, known primarily for his clear, melodious style of whistling
Noella Marcellino, (born 1951), American Benedictine nun who has earned a doctorate in microbiology from the University of Connecticut
Raffaele Marcellino (born 1964), Australian composer
Ss. Marcellino e Pietro, two 4th century Christian martyrs in the city of Rome
Marcellino Pipite, Vanuatuan politician first elected to Parliament in 2004

See also
San Marcellino, comune (municipality) in the Province of Caserta in the Italian region Campania
San Marcellino, Cremona, church in Cremona
Toto and Marcellino, a 1958 Italian-French comedy film directed by Antonio Musu
Santi Marcellino e Pietro (disambiguation)
Marcelin (disambiguation)
Marcelino
Marcell (disambiguation)
Marcelli
Marcellin (disambiguation)
Marcello
Marcelo